Aimee Watson (born 28 July 1987 in Sydney) is an Australian cross-country skier. She competed at the 2014 Winter Olympics in Sochi. And 2018 Pyeong Chang

Her younger brother Callum Watson also represented Australia in cross-country skiing at the 2014 Winter Olympics.

Competition record

References

External links
 
 
 

1987 births
Living people
Cross-country skiers at the 2014 Winter Olympics
Cross-country skiers at the 2018 Winter Olympics
Olympic cross-country skiers of Australia
Australian female cross-country skiers
Place of birth missing (living people)